Nelly Thomas is a comedian, author, educator and broadcaster from Western Australia, who has lived in Melbourne since 1998.

Comedy
Thomas won the Triple J Raw Comedy competition in 2003 alongside Stephen Sheehan. 
Since then she has performed around the world as a stand-up comedian. Thomas has performed twice at the Edinburgh Fringe, several times at the Melbourne Fringe and is a regular feature at the Melbourne International Comedy Festival.

Solo Shows:
 Family Ties, 2006 (Golden Gibbo Nominee)
 Nelly Thomas is not a Yummy Mummy, 2008
 I Coulda Been A Sailor, with guest appearance by Kate McLennan
 Nelly Thomas is Pleasantly Furious, 2014
Group Shows

 Comedy Zone, 2004, with Stephen Sheehan, Sammy J, Marcus Ryan and hosted by Cal Wilson
 Betty Blues: A Comedy Show about Depression, 2004, By Nelly Thomas and featuring Toby Sullivan, Jill Peakock, Sam Simmons & Natalie Michelle Smith
 Raw Prawns, 2004, Nelly Thomas with Steve Sheehan, Josh Makinda and Marcus Ryan
 Mother of the Year, 2009, with Catherine Deveny and Christine Basil
 A Black Sheep Walked into a Baaaa, 2009, written by the performers and writers from Ilbijerri Aboriginal and Torres Strait Islander Theatre Company with Nelly Thomas, Directed by Rachel Maza-Long
 Glorious Baaaastards, 2010, written by the performers and writers from Ilbijerri Aboriginal and Torres Strait Islander Theatre Company with Nelly Thomas, Directed by Rachel Maza-Long

Director

 Plan B, 2005, written and performed by Barry Award Winning Maria Bamford and directed by Nelly Thomas
 Everything Must Go, 2011, Rachel Leary, Directed by Damian Callinan, Assistant Director, Nelly Thomas
 Who’s That Chic?, 2012, Candy B & Busty Beats, Directed by Nelly Thomas
 Tales from the Crip, 2014, Written and performed by Stella Young, Directed by Nelly Thomas. Winner Best Newcomer Melbourne International Comedy Festival.

Thomas programmed and ran a regular Character Comedy room at various venues including Trades Hall, Melbourne HiFi Club and at various festivals. It was the first dedicated character comedy room in Australia and featured performers such as Kate McLennan, Wes Snelling, Lawrence Mooney, Andrea Powell, Maria Bamford, Ross Daniels, Casey Bennetto, Damian Callinan, Lisa Maza, Linda Haggar, Fahey Younger, Adam Richard and more.

In 2009, Thomas appeared on the Australian television comedy history quiz show ADbc and 2015's Judith Lucy Is All Woman. She appears as a regular guest commentator on ABC TV's News Breakfast. Thomas works regularly on ABC Melbourne Radio and has hosted the Evening Show from time to time. She is also a regular guest on Raf Epstein's Afternoon show where she provides commentary on news and events of the week. Thomas often appears on the Radio National Friday afternoon quiz with Patricia Karvelas.

Thomas has featured on a number of podcasts - most notably several appearances on Wil Anderson's Wilosophy. In 2020, Thomas started her own podcast – Person, Place and Thing - and guests have included Rosie Battie, Jason Tamiru, Maria Bamford, Eddie Perfect and more.

Thomas has directed a number of well-known comedians including Maria Bamford and Candy Bowers as well as some of her own shows. Her most successful directing venture was with the late, great comedian and disability activist Stella Young, whose debut show Tales from the Crip won Best Newcomer at the 2014 Melbourne International Comedy Festival. Stella passed away the same year and Nelly delivered a well-known eulogy for her friend and colleague at the Melbourne Town Hall.

Writing
Thomas is the author of five books. 
 What Women Want Random House, 2012. .
 Some Girls Illustrated by Sarah Dunk. 2017. .
 Some Boys Illustrated by Sarah Dunk. 2018. .
 Some Brains : a book celebrating neurodiversity Illustrated by Cat MacInnes. 2019. .
Some Mums are Fat Molls, illustrated by Cat MacInnes. It is a stunning picture book for adults that rebukes of all the insults that are hurled at women. It’s a bawdy, sweary, funny book for modern mums. The titled was inspired by the first ever heckled Nelly received on stage - "Ya fat moll!".
She writes regularly for the Australian print and online media including The Guardian and The Sydney Morning Herald and a column for New Matilda.

Broadcasting
She is a regular guest and presenter on ABC local radio and guest on Radio National.

In 2018 she wrote and presented The C Word, a documentary about class in Australia for Radio National's Earshot.

In 2010, Thomas co-hosted the Boxcutters podcast. In 2020 she launched Person, Place & Thing: a little podcast for Big Times.

Educator
Before winning Raw Comedy, Thomas worked in the welfare sector and has continued to advocate for issues including homelessness, asylum seeker rights, gender and women's rights.
  
In 2011, she launched a DVD called The Talk to encourage young people and their parents and carers to talk openly about smart sex choices.
In 2003 Thomas created the No Means No Show, a live show aimed at teaching adolescents about making smart choices regarding sex.

From 2016 to 2019 Thomas was an Ambassador for Jean Hailes for Women's Health.

Notes

Australian women comedians
People from Merredin, Western Australia
Living people
1974 births